Manchester City Esports is the name of several esports teams owned and operated by Premier League football club Manchester City F.C. Though their primary operation is in the UK, as with the football team, they also run teams in China and South Korea.

Current divisions

UK 
Manchester City's first esports team was founded in Manchester in 2016, to compete in European FIFA competitions. They went on to partner with FaZe Clan in 2019, and in 2021, they established a Fortnite Battle Royale team.

FIFA 
Manchester City started its first esports team in 2016 by signing their first esports athlete Kieran "Kez" Brown, followed the year after by their second player Marcus "ExpectSporting" Jorgensen, who signed from Brøndby IF.

Roster

Achievements

Fortnite Battle Royale 
In October 2021 Manchester City launched its first team outside of FIFA with an entry into Fortnite Battle Royale by signing 16-year-old American Aidan "Threats" Mong. Manchester City had launched a search to sign its first Fortnite Battle Royale player. Prospects up to the task had to navigate through a process that could end with an esports contract. Dubbed the City Solos Hunt, the campaign required players to submit a video explaining why they should be the next member of Manchester City Esports. In April 2022 20-year-old Konrad "Skram" joined the Fortnite Battle Royale roster as the first european player.

Roster

China 

Manchester City Esports China is the Chinese esports team of Manchester City F.C. To date the only game in which Manchester City China have competed is FIFA Online. At the team's launch, it was announced that they had signed three leading Chinese players, including Zhang Jun (known as 'ArecaJun' ), the previous season's Most Valuable Player. Filling out their roster of five players, they also announced that the final two players would be signed based on performances in a tournament which Chinese fans of the football club could enter.

FIFA Online

Roster

Achievements

South Korea 

Manchester City Esports Korea is the South Korean esports team of Manchester City F.C. The team was created in 2019 in order to compete in FIFA Online 4 tournaments in South Korea.

FIFA Online

Roster

References

External links
 
 

FIFA (video game series) teams
Manchester City F.C. Esports
Esports teams based in England
Esports teams established in 2016